Bletilla striata, known as hyacinth orchid or Chinese ground orchid, is a species of flowering plant in the orchid family Orchidaceae, native to Japan, Korea, Myanmar (Burma), and China (Anhui, Fujian, Gansu, Guangdong, Guangxi, Guizhou, Hubei, Hunan, Jiangsu, Jiangxi, Shaanxi, Sichuan, Zhejiang). It is most commonly found growing in clumps alongside grassy slopes with sandy soil. 

The Latin specific epithet striata means “striped”, in reference to the ribbed leaves.

Description 

Bletilla striata is a terrestrial orchid with pleated, spear-shaped leaves. It breaks dormancy in early spring, with each tuber of the previous year potentially sending out multiple shoots. These growths mature over the course of a couple months and eventually bear 3-7 magenta-pink flowers.

Cultivation 

It has gained the Royal Horticultural Society’s Award of Garden Merit.

In the U.S. it may be grown in USDA hardiness zones 5–9, although a winter mulching for plants grown in zone 5 is recommended. 

Like most terrestrial orchids, it drops its leaves as it enters winter dormancy; however, it tolerates moisture during this period much better than most others. Nevertheless, it is encouraged to grow Bletilla striata in a well-draining, humus-rich mix.

Uses 

Bletilla striata is used in Asian traditional medicine for treating problems with the lining of the alimentary canal, e.g. ulcers.

It is also used as a natural glue for making silk strings for traditional Chinese instruments like the guqin.

References

External links 

Gardenia.net

striata
Orchids of China
Orchids of Korea
Orchids of Myanmar
Orchids of Japan
Flora of the Ryukyu Islands
Plants described in 1784